Val-d'Or ("Golden Valley" or "Valley of Gold") is a city in Quebec, Canada with a population of 32,752 inhabitants according to the Canada 2021 Census. The city is located in the Abitibi-Témiscamingue region near La Vérendrye Wildlife Reserve.

History

Gold was discovered in the area in 1923. The name of the town is French for "Valley of Gold." While gold is still mined in the area today, base metals, such as copper (Cu), zinc (Zn), and lead (Pb) have become increasingly important resources. The ore is usually found in volcanic rocks that were deposited on the sea floor over 2.7 billion years ago. They are referred to as volcanic-hosted (or volcanogenic) massive sulphide deposits (VMS).

The city is known for its vast parks, cycle tracks, and forests. Some other attractions include the City of Gold and the mining village of Bourlamaque, which were officially proclaimed historic sites in 1979.

The city hosted the Quebec Games in 1987.  The local hockey team, the Val-d'Or Foreurs, have played in the QMJHL since 1993, winning the league championship in 1998, 2001 and 2014 to claim a spot in the Memorial Cup. They play at Centre Air Creebec. The Foreurs' mascot is called Dynamit, named after dynamite which was extensively used by the mining industry of Val-d'Or.

Val-d'Or was once home to CFS Val-d'Or, a Canadian Forces Station.

In the municipal reorganizations of January 1, 2002, Val-d'Or was merged with the neighbouring municipalities of Dubuisson, Sullivan, Val-Senneville and Vassan.

The Radio-Canada investigative television program, Enquête, revealed in October 2015 numerous allegations of assault and sexual abuse of local aboriginal women by members of the provincial police, the Sûreté du Québec. The news propelled the town into the national spotlight, causing  Québec's Public Safety Minister, Lise Thériault, to suspend the officers and launch an independent investigation led by the Montréal police force.

Demographics 

Population:
 Population in 2016: 32,491
 2011 to 2016 population change: +1.97%
 Population in 2011: 31,862
 Population total in 2001: 31,430
 Dubuisson: 1,686
 Sullivan: 3,529
 Val-d'Or: 22,748
 Val-Senneville: 2,479
 Vassan: 988
 Population in 1996:
 Dubuisson: 1,655
 Sullivan: 3,312
 Val-d'Or: 24,479
 Val-Senneville: 2,408
 Vassan: 988

Mother Tongue:
 English: 2.74%
 French: 94.16%
 English and French: 0.59%
 Other only: 2.22%

City council
City council (as of 2022):
 Mayor: Céline Brindamour
 Councillors: Maxime Gagné, Benjamin Turcotte, Èveline Laverdière, Martin Lavoie, Jean St-Jules, Sylvie Hébert, Lisyane Morin, Yvon Rodrigue

Media

Almost all media in Val-d'Or and the nearby city of Rouyn-Noranda serves both cities. Although the cities are far enough apart that radio and television stations in the area serve the cities from separate transmitters, almost every broadcast station in either city has a rebroadcaster in the other city. The only nominal exceptions are the cities' separate NRJ stations, although at present even these stations share the majority of their broadcast schedule.

Economy

Air Creebec, a regional airline, has its headquarters in Val-d'Or and the Val-d'Or Airport serves as its hub.
 
Val-d'Or's proximity to the Abitibi gold belt has made it a large gold producer, being part of a region that produced 45 million ounces of gold since the 1930s.

Access to the mine is via paved road from Val d'Or.

Geography
Val-d’Or is situated on the Canadian Shield at an elevation of 1100 feet (330m) above sea level.  Although its name refers to a valley (“Val”), the city is actually situated on a vast, slightly undulating plain.

Val-d’Or is at the heart of a vast hydrographic network which includes to the north Lake Blouin, the head water of the Harricana River and to the south Baie Carrière, a reservoir which feeds the Ottawa River.

Climate
Val-d'Or has a humid continental climate (Köppen Climate Classification Dfb), closely bordering on a subarctic climate (Dfc) with warm, humid summers and severely cold winters. There are 18.4 days where the temperature will fall below  although with the wind chill factored in, it can occasionally drop below . Snowfall totals are heavy, averaging  with reliable snow cover from November to April. Summers are warm with a July daily high of  though highs reach above  an average of 4.3 days per year. Val-d'Or receives 
of precipitation per year which is fairly evenly distributed throughout the year, though precipitation is heaviest during the warmest months. Val-d'Or receives 1853 hours of sunshine per or about 39.5 of possible daylight hours, ranging from a low of 19.2% in November to a high of 52.9% in July.

Education
The Centre de services scolaire de l'Or-et-des-Bois operates French-language public schools, while the Western Quebec School Board operates English-language public schools.

The city also hosts campuses of Cégep de l'Abitibi-Témiscamingue and of UQAT.

Notable people
  Yolette Lévy (1938-2018), Haitian-born Canadian politician and activist

See also 
Parc Roland-Veillet, a public park
List of towns in Quebec

References

External links

 Municipal website 

 
Cities and towns in Quebec